The Surround Stakes is an Australian Turf Club Group 1 Thoroughbred horse race for three-year-old fillies, run at set weights over a distance of 1400 metres at Randwick Racecourse, Sydney, Australia in late February or early March. Total prize money for the race is A$600,000.

History
The race is named after 1976–1977 Australian Champion Racehorse of the Year, Surround the only three-year-old filly in history to win the Cox Plate. The race was run at Randwick Racecourse in 1980 and 1981.

Grade
 1979–1985 - Group 3
 1986–2017 - Group 2
 2018 onwards - Group 1

Venue
 1979 - Warwick Farm Racecourse
 1980–1981 - Randwick Racecourse
 1982–2000 - Warwick Farm Racecourse
 2001 - Randwick Racecourse
 2002–2007 - Warwick Farm Racecourse
 2008–2009 - Randwick Racecourse
 2010–2015 - Warwick Farm Racecourse
 2016 onwards - Randwick Racecourse

Winners
 
 2023 - Sunshine In Paris
 2022 - Hinged
 2021 - Forbidden Love
 2020 - Probabeel
 2019 - Nakeeta Jane
 2018 - Shoals
 2017 - La Bella Diosa
 2016 - Ghisoni 
 2015 - First Seal 
 2014 - Thump
 2013 - Dear Demi
 2012 - Streama
 2011 - Parables
 2010 - More Joyous
 2009 - Portillo
 2008 - Chinchilla Rose
 2007 - Gold Edition
 2006 - Regal Cheer
 2005 - Lotteria
 2004 - Only Words
 2003 - Bollinger
 2002 - Hosannah
 2001 - On Type
 2000 - Ad Alta
 1999 - Savannah Success
 1998 - Staging
 1997 - Dashing Eagle
 1996 - Shame
 1995 - Princess D'Or
 1994 - So Keen
 1993 - Skating
 1992 - Office
 1991 - Let's Hurry
 1990 - Ochiltree
 1989 - Glenview
 1988 - Judyann
 1987 - Khaptivaan
 1986 - Ma Chiquita
 1985 - Avon Angel
 1984 - La Caissiere
 1983 - Royal Regatta
 1982 - Lost World
 1981 - Hanalei
 1980 - Brava Jeannie
 1979 - Impede

See also
 List of Australian Group races
 Group races

External links 
First three placegetters Surround Stakes (ATC)

References

Group 1 stakes races in Australia